Mad River Township is one of the ten townships of Clark County, Ohio, United States. The 2010 census reported 11,156 people living in the township, 8,741 of whom lived in the unincorporated portions of the township.

Geography
Located in the southwestern part of the county, it borders the following townships:
Springfield Township - northeast
Green Township - east
Miami Township, Greene County - southeast
Bath Township, Greene County - southwest
Bethel Township - northwest

Several towns are located in Mad River Township:
The village of Enon, in the center of the township
Part of the city of Springfield, the county seat of Clark County, in the northeastern corner of the township
The census-designated place of Green Meadows, in the center of the township
The census-designated place of Holiday Valley, in the south of the township

Name and history
Mad River Township is named from the Mad River, which forms its western boundary.

Statewide, the only other Mad River Township is located in Champaign County.

Government
The township is governed by a three-member board of trustees, who are elected in November of odd-numbered years to a four-year term beginning on the following January 1. Two are elected in the year after the presidential election and one is elected in the year before it. There is also an elected township fiscal officer, who serves a four-year term beginning on April 1 of the year after the election, which is held in November of the year before the presidential election. Vacancies in the fiscal officership or on the board of trustees are filled by the remaining trustees.

References

External links
County website

Townships in Clark County, Ohio
Townships in Ohio